Gangampalli is a small village near Giddaluru in Prakasam District, India.

References

Villages in Prakasam district